Lenny Blue is a British television crime drama series first broadcast on ITV between 1 October 2000 and 2 July 2002, under the title of Tough Love. Two series were broadcast, each starring Ray Winstone as protagonist DC Lenny Milton, an officer tasked by the IPCC to go undercover to investigate claims of corruption against his boss, Mike Love (Adrian Dunbar). The series also follows his dogged pursuit of drug dealer Barry Hindes (David Hayman). The first series was released on VHS only on 1 July 2002, having never been released on DVD. The second series was released on DVD on 15 October 2008.

Plot
The plotline for the first series was given by ITV as follows: "Lenny Milton (Ray Winstone) is not as ambitious as his best friend and popular boss DCI Michael Love (Adrian Dunbar), but the pair are drinking partners and their wives and children are close. However, this goes very wrong over the space of seven days, when Milton is approached by the police complaints division asking him to go undercover and investigate allegations of corruption against his friend. Milton finds this difficult at first and tries to dismiss the evidence building up. But as his suspicions begin to take shape, his position appears to be in danger."

Series two follows Milton's dogged quest to bring down Barry Hindes (David Hayman), after a friend of his son's dies in a heroin-related overdose, and a gang war between drug dealers breaks out on his local estate.

Cast
 Ray Winstone as DC Lenny Milton
 Jake Wood as DS Pete Ainsworth
 David Hayman/Ralph Brown as Barry Hindes
 Adrian Dunbar as DCI Michael 'Mike' Love (Series 1)
 Annabelle Apsion as DI Karen Irving (Series 1)
 Bruce Byron as DC Gerry Singleton (Series 1)
 Sophie Stanton as WDS Denise Wright (Series 1)
 Colin Tierney as DS Eddie Connolly (Series 1)
 Amanda Drew as WDC Jilly Barnes (Series 1)
 David Hemmings as DCI Tommy Gillespie (Series 2)
 Mark Lewis Jones as DC Huw Morgan (Series 2)
 Ivan Kaye as DI Ron Featherstone (Series 2)
 Emma Lowndes as DC Kerry Allen (Series 2)

Episode list

Series 1 (2000)

Series 2 (2002)

Reception
Euan Ferguson of The Guardian said of the series: "Lenny Blue was finely scripted, beautifully shot and carefully acted throughout – no big-screen British crime drama would dare attempt the scene, far from central to the plot, in which the mother of a dead teenager reduced a school hall to a hunched and whimpered awkwardness. You can only hope we don't have to wait another two years for the return of Lenny and his sad smile, which only really flickered near his wife, and his son, and then once, quite terrifyingly, at the end, when he had to do what had to be done."

A third series was not commissioned because of falling ratings, with Series Two only receiving half of the viewing figures of Series One. However, this was blamed on poor scheduling, the second episode clashing with the debut of highly anticipated BBC drama Paradise Heights.

References

External links

ITV television dramas
2000 British television series debuts
2002 British television series endings
2000s British crime television series
2000s British drama television series
British detective television series
Television shows produced by Granada Television
Television series by ITV Studios
English-language television shows
Television shows set in Brighton